A party horn  (also a party blower, party pipe, party elephant, party blowout, noisemaker, party whistle, party honker, ta-doo-dah, noise popper, birthday kazoo, whizzer, blow tickler, tongue kazoo, or party snake) is a horn formed from a paper tube, often flattened and rolled into a coil, which unrolls when blown into, producing a horn-like noise. It is not consistently known by any single term in English, but by a number of local variations, neologisms and individual terms often containing variants and synonyms of blowing (puffing, blow-out etc.) and noise (whistle, squeak etc.).

Modern variations have a plastic mouthpiece to prevent swift degradation from the moisture of the mouth. The paper tube often contains a coiled metal or plastic strip that rapidly retracts the horn after it is blown. Others have a brightly colored feather attached to the end which vibrates in the outgoing airflow.

The world record for the most people blowing party horns at one time was set on November 21, 2009 with 6091 people in Tokyo, Japan.

References

Horn, party
Paper toys
Free reed aerophones
Toy instruments and noisemakers